Kosmos 461 ( meaning Cosmos 461), also known as DS-U2-MT No.1, was a Soviet satellite which was launched in 1971 as part of the Dnepropetrovsk Sputnik programme. It was a  spacecraft, which was built by the Yuzhnoye Design Bureau, and was used to investigate micrometeoroids and conduct gamma ray astronomy.

Launch 
A Kosmos-3M carrier rocket, serial number 47119-109, was used to launch Kosmos 461 into low Earth orbit. The launch took place from Site 132/1 at the Plesetsk Cosmodrome. The launch occurred at 17:30:00 UTC on 2 December 1971, and resulted in the successful insertion of the satellite into orbit.

Orbit 
Upon reaching orbit, the satellite was assigned its Kosmos designation, and received the International Designator 1971-105A. The North American Aerospace Defense Command assigned it the catalogue number 05643.

Kosmos 461 was the only DS-U2-MT satellite to be launched. It completed operations on 14 December 1972, before decaying from orbit and reentering the atmosphere on 21 February 1979.

See also

 1971 in spaceflight

References

1971 in spaceflight
Kosmos satellites
Spacecraft launched in 1971
Dnepropetrovsk Sputnik program